Albert – Picardie Airport , sometimes referred to as Albert – Picardy Airport, is an airport serving Albert, a commune of the Somme department in the Picardy (Picardie) region of northern France.

It is primarily used for the transportation of Airbus aircraft parts from the company's factory at Méaulte nearby. The airport's runway is large enough to accommodate Airbus' Beluga, a large cargo aircraft used to courier parts used in the construction of its own commercial jets.

The airport is also home to a flying club, which has a number of light aircraft based at the airfield; and to a society engaging in historic aircraft.

The British low-cost carrier Jet2.com announced and then cancelled a twice-weekly service to the Somme using this airport; flights were to start in April 2009.

On 28 January 2012, plans were unveiled to launch a twice-weekly service to Blackpool International Airport with Danish Air Transport using ATR 72s, however before the flights started, the route was cancelled.

At the end of 2013, a service to Toulouse, Dole and Nice was introduced under the "IGAvion" brand. The flights were operated by Skytaxi with Saab 340 aircraft.

History
The aerodrome was first created to serve the aircraft factory of Henry Potez, around 1924. The factory (a short distance from the current airport) was later merged, successively, into SNCAN, Nord Aviation, Aerospatiale, and finally Airbus.

Facilities
It has one paved runway designated 09/27 which measures .

Statistics

References

External links 
 Aéroport Albert Picardie, official site
 
 

Airports in Hauts-de-France
Buildings and structures in Somme (department)